Iran Hormoz 24 is a class of landing ship tank operated by the Navy of the Islamic Revolutionary Guard Corps.

History 
The vessels were built at a shipyard in Inchon, South Korea between 1985 and 1986. The vessels are reportedly registered as merchant ships in official documents. All three were launched on 20 December 1985, and were given placeholder names Hormoz 24, Hormoz 25 and Hormoz 26.

Description
Having 110 spare berthings, Hormoz 24 vessels are able to carry 9 tanks or 140 troops.

Ships in the class
The vessels of this class in IRGC service are:

References 

Amphibious warfare vessel classes
Ship classes of the Islamic Revolutionary Guard Corps
Ships built in South Korea